The 2014–15 season was Cardiff City Football Club's 98th season playing professional football and the 87th in the Football League. Cardiff were relegated from the Premier League during the last season, meaning an instant return to the Championship, the second tier in English football. Also during this season, it was announced that the club would revert back to blue home kits with the red being made the away kit. The first home game back in blue was a 1-0 victory over Fulham on January 10, 2015.

Football League Championship

League table

Results

Kit

|
|
|

First Team Squad

 Appearances and goals for the club are up to date as of 3 May 2015.

Statistics

|-
|colspan="14"|Players currently out on loan:

|-
|colspan="14"|Players featured for club who have left:

Captains

Goalscorers

Disciplinary record

Suspensions served

Contracts

Transfers

In

 Total spending ~ £13,512,000+

Loans In

Out

Loans Out

Fixtures & Results

Pre-season

Championship

FA Cup

League Cup

Overall summary

Summary

Score overview

Development Team

Under 21 Premier League Group 2

Club staff

Backroom staff

Board of directors

Notes

References

External links
 
 

2014-15
Welsh football clubs 2014–15 season
2014–15 Football League Championship by team